The British Rail Class 395 Javelin is a dual-voltage electric multiple-unit (EMU) passenger train built by Hitachi Rail as part of the Hitachi A-train AT300 family for high-speed commuter services on High Speed 1 and elsewhere on the South Eastern franchise. The whole fleet is operated by Southeastern.

It is typically formed as a six-car train, although they can be rapidly coupled to one another to form a 12-car train as required. The type, which was entirely manufactured in Japan, is the first Hitachi-built rail vehicle to be sold to a European customer, as well as being the first British order for a Japanese train. The fleet was ordered during June 2005 by HSBC Rail, and was delivered to the UK between August 2007 and August 2009. Following the completion of  fault-free running six months ahead of schedule, a 'preview' service was launched between London St Pancras and Ashford via Ebbsfleet on 18 June 2009. These were gradually expanded until the commencement of the full regular service on 13 December 2009.

The use of the high-speed trains as part of the transport infrastructure for the Olympic Park formed part of the original bid for the 2012 Summer Olympics. The service was named the Olympic Javelin, which formed the origin of the Javelin nickname. The Olympic services began 28 July 2012. Furthermore, the Class 395 has also been irregularly operated for charter servicesthough the first such uses did not happen until after the 2012 Olympics due to a lack of free units.

History

Background
In December 2003, formal approval was given by the Strategic Rail Authority for domestic services to be run on the under-construction Channel Tunnel Rail Link (CTRL) in Kent, England, which has since been rebranded as High Speed 1 (HS1). Preliminary consultations for a new franchise including the envisioned 'CTRL Domestic' services along with new rolling stock for operating the said services, which were to begin in 2004. In 2005, the proposed high-speed services were combined with those from the former South Eastern rail franchise to form the Integrated Kent franchise (IKF).

In October 2004, Hitachi was announced as the preferred bidder to supply high-speed trains for the CTRL services. During June 2005, a contract valued at £250million was signed with Hitachi Europe to supply 28 units, with Eversholt Rail Group acting as the financier (ROSCO); at this point, the new fleet had an expected service date of 2009. In November 2005, the Department for Transport announced Govia as the new operator of the IKF.

The contract was Hitachi's first rail vehicle sold to a European customer. The company had previously worked with HSBC Rail and UK rail authorities between 2002 and 2003 to demonstrate that the company's traction system was suitable for use on the Great Britain rail network, including testing asynchronous AC motors and confirming electromagnetic compatibility, as part of a separate contract involving the upgrade of existing Class 465 and 466 EMUs. The contract was also the first British order for a Japanese train; as such, Hitachi viewed the deal as a key opportunity to establish itself in the UK market.

Construction of the CTRL (High Speed 1) was complete in November 2007. By 2008, the initially planned 'CTRL Domestic' services (2003) from London St Pancras to Gravesend, and Canterbury West and Folkestone Central, via Ashford, had been expanded in scope to include services to Medway Towns, East Kent and Dover. Furthermore, a 29th train was added to the order agreement by franchise holder Southeastern so as to provide additional capacity.

Maintenance depots and training

The contract for the trains included maintenance of the trains; according to Hitachi, the maintenance techniques and schedules of which being initially generated from experience of their Shinkansen cousins in Japan. Maintenance services are provided via a consortium, referred to as 'DEPCO', which included HSBC Rail (finance), Fitzpatrick Contractors Ltd (construction), RPS Burks Green (architects/civil engineers), EMCOR UK (mechanical and electrical plant) and GrantRail (trackwork) constructed a new maintenance depot building at Ashford and the updating of the existing depot site.

The new Ashford Depot was constructed on the site of the Ashford Down Yard Carriage Sidings, and formally opened on 2 October 2007. The facility included a five-track trainshed with bogie drop made by BBM and train lifting equipment from Mechan. A second building housed a wheel lathe from Sculfort. Other facilities included carriage washing plant, a 25kV OHL test track, and sidings for rolling stock. The design and layout of the depot, which was optimised specifically for the Class 395, enables the most efficient workflow possible, including minimal complex shunting actions, physical minimisation wherever reasonable, and in line with modern data management practices.

A Class 395 train simulator supplied by Corys TESS was acquired for use at Southeastern's training centre in Ashford for driver training. Southeastern's co-parent company SNCF also assisted with high-speed driver training. The DEPCO consortium also updated Ramsgate train depot for the IKF with facilities including storage sidings for the Class 395 trains and light maintenance facilities.

Testing and preview service

Pre-shipping factory tests included static and dynamic load tests, traction and braking tests, including tests on a 750VDC third-rail system specially installed at Hitachi's test track. This round of manufacturer tests included the use of supercomputers to conduct both simulations and verification tests.

The first train was delivered from Japan to Southampton Docks on 23 August 2007. Days later, it was unveiled by Secretary of State for Transport Ruth Kelly at a media event held at Hitachi's new Ashford maintenance facility. Following the delivery of the first four units in March 2008, production was temporarily put on hold while these units were subjected to extensive UK-based testing. Homologation testing was undertaken by Serco. SNCF International assisted with testing of KVB and TVM 430 signalling systems, with speeds of  attained in January 2008.

Following the successful completion of these tests, production and shipping of the main production tranche commenced in December 2008. Each train was required to demonstrate  of fault-free operations prior to their acceptance by Southeastern. The final three trains arrived in the UK in August 2009, with the final train delivered to Southeastern on 11 December 2009.

The performance metric of  fault-free running was achieved six months ahead of schedule, clearing the way for a 'preview' service to be offered between London St Pancras and Ashford via Ebbsfleet. On 18 June 2009, these were ceremonially launched by the Secretary of State for Transport Andrew Adonis, although the preview service only became available to general passengers on 29 June. The preview service allowed for further train testing under real-world conditions, during which the type reportedly achieved a 99% punctuality rate in the first month of operations. In September 2009, preliminary services were launched to the Kent coast (Dover via Folkestone, and Ramsgate via Canterbury). During November 2009, preview services commenced on the North Kent line as well.

Even during the preview service, the Class 395 presented several performance improvements in comparison to conventional rolling stock, including its high rate of acceleration, lower noise levels (primarily attributed to its air conditioning arrangements), and its aesthetic appeal. Railway journalist Richard Clinnick observed several minor shortcomings of the interior, such as the somewhat cramped seating arrangement and the lack of securing straps at the baby changing facility, but positively reviewed the overall package. In September 2010, it was reported that several passengers were concerned by the presence of a 'wobbling' motion that occurred within some tunnel sections; the phenomenon was described by Southeastern as non-dangerous, but all trains were fitted with dampers that prevent any recurrence of the issue.

Operations and performance

A full regular service commenced on 13 December 2009. Initial services included a half-hourly north Kent service to and from St Pancras, London, via Stratford, Ebbsfleet, Gravesend, Strood, Rochester, Chatham, Gillingham, Rainham, and Sittingbourne to Faversham, a half-hourly service to East Kent via Stratford, Ebbsfleet, Ashford with one train continuing to Margate via Canterbury West, Ramsgate and Broadstairs, with the other to Dover via Folkestone West and Folkestone Central. Seven million journeys were made in the first year of operation.

The introduction of the trains was generally successful, with good reliability and passenger satisfaction figures. The new high-speed services also caused an increase in passenger numbers above that already being experienced on the Kent network. On introduction, timetabled journeys to London from Ebbsfleet were reduced from 51 to 18 minutes, whilst trains using the entire length of High Speed 1 (starting in Ashford) had timetabled journeys reduced by around 45 minutes.
However, the service has been criticised as being of limited use to many London commuters because trains terminate at St Pancras. Additionally, the change in service patterns to accommodate high-speed trains resulted in some non-high-speed services in Kent becoming slower.

In May 2011, a limited service from Maidstone West via  and  started, followed in September 2011 by a limited service from Sandwich via Deal to London St Pancras (partially subsidised by Kent County Council). In 2013, four years after the service started, total passenger numbers were ten million and punctuality was 92.6% (compared to 90.1% nationwide).

Design

The 400 Series Mini Shinkansen and Hitachi's A Train design form the basis of the Class 395 design. From the 400 Series the class inherits the same six-car 20-metre carriage with doors at one-third and two-thirds along the carriage. Both types of train are designed for operations at high speed on newly built lines, as well as at lower speed on conventional legacy lines. Unlike the steel-bodied 400 Series, the Class 395 has its carbody (walls, roof, floor) formed from friction stir welded (FSW) double-walled hollow extruded aluminium body panels, a technology that Hitachi Rail considers to be a part of its A-Train train family specification. The manufacturer claims that the FSW approach achieves minimal strain while providing a lightweight and high strength carbody in comparison to conventional techniques.

Each Class 395 unit contains six cars, formed DPT1-MS1-MS2-MS3-MS4-DPT2. The intermediate cars carry the traction motors - one at each axle - while the unpowered outer cars carry the pantographs. The bogies are bolsterless, with both powered and unpowered bogies sharing a common design to simplify maintenance. Each six-car unit can work in multiple with another to create 12-car trains. The coupling process is automated and has been designed to take less than 60seconds.

The propulsion system of the Class 395 comprises 16 electric motors each rated to produce  that work in conjunction with four IGBT converter/inverter units. The train uses an electrically operated air brake system, supplied by Faiveley. Approximately 40% of the train's components were sourced from suppliers within the European Union.

Each six-car train is fitted with 340 seats in 2+2 formation, all standard class, with an additional twelve tip-up priority seats located in an indicated wheelchair area near the vestibules of the DPT1 vehicle. There is no separation between the vestibules and the main interior save for wind shields. There are two toilets per unit, one of which is larger and designed to be universally accessible. The seats are mostly arranged 'airline' style, though there are also a small number of table seats present in each car. Nearly all seats feature flip-down tables and coat hooks, while a single electrical socket has been provided for each pair of seats. The interior design and layout is in conformance with the Rail Vehicle Accessibility Regulations 2010.

The trains meet UK Railway Group Standards (RGS), and European Union Technical Specifications for Interoperability (TSI) standards for crashworthiness, and UK or EU standards for structure-load-bearing behaviour, material strength, aerodynamics, noise and fire resistance. Key areas of the train's design that were heavily influenced by these standards were its fireproofing measures and crashworthiness approach, which Hitachi observed to bear considerable differences with their corresponding Japanese standards. In addition to the applicable standards, the Class 395 was greatly shaped by the various criteria specified by the customer. Wherever it has been beneficial to do so, the various technologies and new approaches developed for the type have been incorporated by Hitachi back into its main product lines.

Each train is equipped with a computer-based Train Management System (TMS), which incorporates numerous monitoring systems, communications, environmental controls, and enables the train crew to control various onboard systems, including Selective Door Operation (SDO). The TMS features considerable redundancy, which has enabled it to obtain a SIL 2 safety certification. The SDO system uses a combination of GPS and train speed integration to estimate its position and identify the station at which the train has stopped, simplifying the correct door selection sequence. For reliability, passenger doors use a relatively simple sliding pneumatic system that has already been in use for several decades on Shinkansen trains.

Named units

A mockup Class 395 unit was named after athlete Dame Kelly Holmes; the name was subsequently transferred to an operational unit and 11 other "fast Britons"Jamie Staff, Steve Backley, Sir Steve Redgrave, Rebecca Adlington, Sir Chris Hoy, Ben Ainslie, Daley Thompson, Duncan Goodhew, Katherine Grainger, Lord Sebastian Coe, and Dame Tanni Grey-Thompson; all Olympic/Paralympic medallistswere selected in a public vote.

Following the 2012 Olympics and Paralympics, Southeastern announced that another 12 units would be named after members of Team GB, including Alistair Brownlee, Ed Clancy, Hannah Cockroft, Jessica Ennis, Mo Farah, Jason Kenny, Jonnie Peacock, Victoria Pendleton, Ellie Simmonds, Dame Sarah Storey, Laura Trott, and David Weir.

Some units have subsequently received other names.

Fleet details

Accidents 
At 3pm on 23 October 2017, 395008 (heading towards London St Pancras) struck a delivery van on a level crossing near Teynham between Faversham and Sittingbourne.

Model railways
In 2009 Hornby Railways launched two model versions of the BR Class 395, a super detailed model, and a basic representation of the prototype as part of their Railroad range both in South Eastern Blue livery and in 2012 Hornby released a special Olympic Games Livery in both super detail and basic in OO gauge.

See also
List of high-speed trains
JR Kyushu 885 seriesanother member of the Hitachi A-train family

Notes

References

Sources

External links

High-speed trains of the United Kingdom
395
Hitachi multiple units
Passenger trains running at least at 200 km/h in commercial operations
United Kingdom streamliner trains
25 kV AC multiple units
750 V DC multiple units
Train-related introductions in 2009